Runte is a surname. Notable people with the surname include:

Al Runte (born 1947), American environmental historian and college educator
Fritz von Runte, English DJ and music producer
Roseann Runte (born 1948), American academic
Wilhelm Runte (1898–1977), Mayor of Soest, see List of German Free Democratic Party politicians